is a town located in Miyagi Prefecture, Japan. , the town had an estimated population of 10,675, and a population density of 140 persons per km2 in 4026 households. In September 2014, the 7.4 hectare old centre of town was protected as an Important Preservation District by the national government for its traditional merchant quarter architecture.

Geography
Murata is located in south-central Miyagi Prefecture in the Tōhoku region of northern Japan. The Shiroishi River runs through the town.

Neighboring municipalities
Miyagi Prefecture
Sendai
Natori
Iwanuma
Ōgawara
Shibata
Kawasaki
Zaō

Climate
Murata has a humid climate (Köppen climate classification Cfa) characterized by mild summers and cold winters.  The average annual temperature in Murata is 12.5 °C. The average annual rainfall is 1271 mm with September as the wettest month. The temperatures are highest on average in August, at around 25.0 °C, and lowest in January, at around 1.5 °C.

Demographics
Per Japanese census data, the population of Murata declined over the past 30 years.

History
The area of present-day Murata was part of ancient Mutsu Province, and was part of the holdings of Sendai Domain under the Edo period Tokugawa shogunate. The modern village of Murata was established on April 1, 1889 with the establishment of post-Meiji restoration modern municipalities system. It was promoted to town status on October 31, 1895. The town merged with the neighboring towns on Tomioka and Numabe on April 20, 1955.

Government
Murata has a mayor-council form of government with a directly elected mayor and a unicameral town council of 12 members. Murata, collectively with the other municipalities in Shibata District contributes two seats to the Miyagi Prefectural legislature. In terms of national politics, the town is part of Miyagi 3rd district of the lower house of the Diet of Japan.

Economy
The economy of Murata is largely based on agriculture, and the town is especially known for its production of fava beans.

Education
Murata has two public elementary schools and two public middle schools operated by the town government, and one public high school operated by the Miyagi Prefectural Board of Education.

Transportation

Railway
Murata does not have any passenger train service.

Highway
  – Murata Interchange – Murata Junction
  – Murata Junction

Sister city relations
Buckley, Flintshire, Wales,

Local attractions
Sportsland SUGO

References

External links

Official Website 

 
Towns in Miyagi Prefecture